The Alley Cat may refer to:

The Alley Cat (1929 film)
The Alley Cat (1941 film)
The Alley Cat (1985 film)